Ames Family Homestead is a historic home and farm located in Center Township, LaPorte County, Indiana.  The Captain Charles Ames House was built in 1842, and is a -story, Federal style frame dwelling.  It has a split granite stone basement and a gable roof with dormers.  The Augustus Ames House was built in 1856, and is a -story, Greek Revival style frame dwelling.  It sits on a brick foundation and sheathed in clapboard siding.  Also on the property are the contributing traverse frame barn (1838), privy (c. 1930), ice house (c. 1930), cow shed (c. 1900), corn crib (c. 1930), chicken coop (c. 1940), silo (c. 1930), water pump (c. 1900) driveway marker (c. 1880), and wood shed (c. 1915).

It was listed on the National Register of Historic Places in 2012.

References

Farms on the National Register of Historic Places in Indiana
Federal architecture in Indiana
Greek Revival houses in Indiana
Houses completed in 1842
Houses completed in 1856
Houses in LaPorte County, Indiana
National Register of Historic Places in LaPorte County, Indiana